Elisabeth Ludovika of Bavaria (13 November 1801 – 14 December 1873) was Queen of Prussia as the wife of King Frederick William IV.

Biography

Early life
Elisabeth was born in Munich, the daughter of King Maximilian I Joseph of Bavaria and his Queen Friederike Karoline Wilhelmine Margravine of Baden. She was the identical twin sister of Queen Amalie of Saxony, consort of King John I of Saxony, and sister of Archduchess Sophie of Austria, mother of Emperor Franz Josef I of Austria and Emperor Maximilian I of Mexico; as well as Ludovika, Duchess in Bavaria, mother of Franz Josef's consort, Empress Elisabeth of Austria (Sisi), who was Elisabeth's godchild and namesake. She was known within her family as Elise.

Crown Princess
On 29 November 1823, she married the future King Frederick William IV of Prussia and supported his intellectual interests, namely his attempts at artwork, which he held dear to his heart.  She refused to become a Protestant as a condition of her marriage, insisting that she would only convert if she was convinced on the merits of the reformed faith after studying it for herself.  It was on 5 May 1830, seven years after her marriage, that Elisabeth formally converted to Protestantism. Her union was reportedly happy, but remained childless: after a single miscarriage in 1828, Elisabeth was unable to have any offspring.

Queen
Becoming Queen consort of Prussia in 1840, she was never without influence in Prussian politics, where she was active in preserving the close friendship between Prussia and the Austrian Empire.

To Frederick William IV, she was an exemplary wife and, during his long illness, a dedicated nurse. She was initially hostile to her nephew's British wife, Victoria, Princess Royal, known within the family as Vicky, but their relationship thawed when Vicky took care of Elisabeth and comforted her during the early painful days of her widowhood. Elisabeth never forgot Vicky's kindness and in her will broke with tradition by leaving Vicky her jewels. These jewels were meant to have been bequeathed to the current Queen, (Augusta of Saxe-Weimar, Elisabeth's sister-in-law, who was by then Prussian Queen and German Empress); this was an offense for which Augusta never forgave Vicky.

Queen Dowager
After her husband's death on 2 January 1861, Elisabeth lived quietly at her seats at Sanssouci, Charlottenburg, and Stolzenfels and dedicated herself to charity work in memory of her late husband. Her brother-in-law, Emperor Wilhelm I of Germany, held her in high regard as a true friend.

During a visit to her sister, Queen Amalie of Saxony, Elisabeth died in 1873 in Dresden. She was buried next to her husband on 21 December at the Friedenskirche in Potsdam.

Ancestry

References

Sources
 The information in this article is based on that in its German equivalent.
 Moritz Freiherr von Bissing: Elisabeth Königin von Preußen, Berlin 1974.
 Ludovika Hesekiel: Elisabeth Luise, Königin von Preußen (Berlin 1881).
 Dorothea Minkels: "Porträts der preußischen Königin Elisabeth in der Sammlung des Stadtmuseums Berlin." in: Jahrbuch 2004/2005 Stadtmuseum Berlin, pg. 278–304.
 Alfred v. Reumont: Elisabeth, Königin von Preußen (Berlin 1874)
 Dorothea Minkels: Elisabeth von Preußen. Königin in der Zeit des AusMÄRZens. Norderstedt 2008.

External links

|-

|-

1801 births
1873 deaths
Bavarian princesses
Converts to Lutheranism from Roman Catholicism
Nobility from Munich
House of Wittelsbach
Princesses of Neuchâtel
Prussian princesses
Prussian royal consorts
German Lutherans
German twins
Daughters of kings